Jordan Chan is a Singaporean footballer who plays for Hougang United as a midfielder.

Club career

Young Lions
Chan started his professional career in 2017 where he signed for the under-23 side Young Lions.

Hougang United
In 2018, he switched clubs to Hougang United.

International career
Chan was first called up to the Singapore U22 in 2017 for the match against Vanuatu U20. Chan started in the first game of the tour and he scored his first goal in the 45th minute.

Career statistics 

 Young Lions and LionsXII are ineligible for qualification to AFC competitions in their respective leagues.

International Statistics

U16 International caps

U19 International caps

References

1998 births
Living people
Singaporean footballers
Association football midfielders
Young Lions FC players
Hougang United FC players
Singaporean sportspeople of Chinese descent